Jam Jodhpur is a city and a municipality in Jamnagar district in the Indian state of Gujarat.

Demographics
 India census, Jam Jodhpur had a population of 22,651. Males constitute of 51% of the population and females 49%. Jam Jodhpur has an average literacy rate of 72%, higher than the national average of 59.5%: male literacy is 77%, and female literacy is 67%. In Jam Jodhpur, 11% of the population is under 6 years of age. Jam Jodhpur is one of the richest towns in Gujarat. The reason behind this is that most of the people are having good farms and due to good water supply they are cultivating more and earning more. Dev Patel's (the leading actor of Slumdog movie) grandfather, belongs to Jam Jodhpur-Balva. Also Ghansyam Vaghela known as Sham Vaghela co-founder of the UK Asian music awards and CEO of event star. Indian cricket team player Cheteshwar Pujara's Father-in-law is from Jam Jodhpur.

There are a lot of government servants staying in Jamjodhpur who are working in nearby villages.

Nagarpalika of Jamjodhpur is ranked 2nd well managed in 2009. Water management, roads, under ground gutters are very well managed. Garbage collection vehicle is passing from every street of the city to collect the garbage. This makes city beautiful. People from various places visits Jamjodhpur for its nagarpalika management.

Transport 

Jam Jodhpur is connected by road to the rest of India as well as by railways. State Highway No. 126 pass through city which connects Bhanvad to National Highway No. 8B. Jam Jodhpur Junction railway station is small railway station in the city and Express trains like Porbandar - Santragachi Kavi Guru SF Express, Rajkot-Porbandar Express and Porbandar Somnath Passenger stops.

References

Cities and towns in Jamnagar district